Slieve Mish Mountains, is a predominantly sandstone mountain range at the eastern end of the Dingle Peninsula in County Kerry, Ireland. Stretching , from the first major peak of Barnanageehy outside of Tralee in the east, to Cnoc na Stuaice in near Central Dingle in the west, the range has over 17 material peaks (e.g. height above 100 m), with the core of the mountain range based around the massif of its highest peak, Baurtregaum, and its deep glacial valleys of Derrymore Glen and Curraheen Glen.

Naming 
The Irish language term "Sliabh" denotes a mountain, however, the precise meaning of "Mis" has not been validated.  Irish academic Paul Tempan notes that it could be related to Slemish mountain in County Antrim, where the term "Mis" is from a female name, and thus translates as "the mountains of Mis".

Geology 
Like many of the mountain ranges in Kerry, such as the MacGillycuddy Reeks, the Slieve Mish Mountains are composed predominantly of Devonian period Old Red Sandstone, with a band of Ordovician period metasediments on the western slopes of the range.

The rocks date from the Upper Devonian period (310–450 million years ago) when Ireland was in a hot equatorial setting.  During this 60 million year period, Ireland was the site of a major basin, known as the Munster basin, and Cork and Kerry were effectively a large alluvial floodplain.  Chemical oxidation stained the material with a purple–reddish colour (and green in places from chlorination), still visible today.  There are virtually no fossils in Old Red Sandstone.

The composition of Old Red Sandstone is variable and includes sandstones, mudstones, siltstones, and conglomerates (boulders containing quartz pebbles are visible throughout the range).  The Slieve Mish range was also subject to significant glaciation with corries (e.g. the upper lakes of the Derrymore Glen), U-shaped valleys (e.g. the Derrymore Glen and the Curraheen Glen), however the range does not have the sharp rocky arêtes and ridges of the MacGillycuddy Reeks range.

Geography 
Overlooking Tralee Bay on the northern side and Dingle Bay on the south, the range extends for 19 kilometres from just outside Tralee in the east to the centre of the Dingle Peninsula in the west.  The range is often described as the "backbone" of the Dingle Peninsula because of distribution of most of its major peaks along narrow south-west to north-east "spine" that extends to 6 kilometres at its widest part.

The core of the range is the massif of its highest point Baurtregaum , and the main peaks of the range sit and Baurtregaum's high grassy ridge from Baurtregaum Far NW Top in the east, to Caherconree , and Gearhane , in the west.

Bautregaum has two major glacial U-shaped valleys, the long 4.5-kilometre easterly Curraheen Glen (with the Curraheen River), and the shorter but deeper northerly Derrymore Glen (Derrymore River), with its three corrie lakes.

After descending to the north–south mountain pass of Bóthar na gCloch ("road of the stones") to the west, the spine of the range rises up again at Knockbrack  and Lack Mountain , to run in a further south-westerly direction to finish at Cnoc na Stuaice .

List of peaks

The following is a download from the MountainViews Online Database, who list 17 identifiable Slieve Mish peaks with an elevation, or height, above 100 metres

See also

Brandon Group, a mountain range in Dingle Peninsula
Mountains of the Central Dingle Peninsula, a mountain range in Dingle Peninsula
Lists of mountains in Ireland
List of mountains of the British Isles by height
List of P600 mountains in the British Isles
List of Marilyns in the British Isles
List of Hewitt mountains in England, Wales and Ireland

Notes

References

Marilyns of Ireland
Hewitts of Ireland
Mountains and hills of County Kerry